X Factor is the Bulgarian version of The X Factor, a show originating from the United Kingdom. It is a television music talent show contested by aspiring pop singers drawn from public auditions. The show's inaugural season aired in 2011 on Nova Television.

Series summary
 "Males" category
 "Females" category
 "Over 26s" or "Over 25s" category
 "Groups" category

Judges' categories and their contestants
In each season, each judge is allocated a category to mentor and chooses three (four in the second season) acts to progress to the live finals. This table shows, for each season, which category each judge was allocated and which acts he or she put through to the live finals.

Key:
 – Winning judge/category. Winners are in bold, eliminated contestants in small font.

Table results

Season 1

Colour key

Season 2

Colour key

Notes
1 Maria Ilieva was not required to vote as there was already a majority.

Season 3

Colour key

Notes
1 Lyubo Kirov was not required to vote as there was already a majority.

Season 4

Colour key

Season 5

Colour key

Notes
1 Lyubo Kirov was not required to vote as there was already a majority.

External links
Official site

 
Bulgaria
Television series by Fremantle (company)
2010s Bulgarian television series
Bulgarian music television series
Bulgarian reality television series
2011 Bulgarian television series debuts
2017 Bulgarian television series endings
Bulgarian television series based on British television series
Nova (Bulgarian TV channel) original programming